Rzeczywistość (film) is a Polish historical film. It was released in 1961.

References

External links
 

1961 films
Polish historical films
1960s Polish-language films
1960s historical films